Gisa Wurm (8 October 1885 – 10 August 1957) was an Austrian stage and film actress.

Selected filmography
 Grand Duchess Alexandra (1933)
 Harvest (1936)
 Mirror of Life (1938)
 My Daughter Lives in Vienna (1940)
 Operetta (1940)
 Love Is Duty Free (1941)
 Violanta (1942)
 Two Happy People (1943)
 Gateway to Peace (1951)
 Franz Schubert (1953)
 Lavender (1953)

References

Bibliography
 Giesen, Rolf.  Nazi Propaganda Films: A History and Filmography. McFarland, 2003.

External links

1885 births
1957 deaths
Austrian stage actresses
Austrian film actresses